The Johnsons or  De Johnsons  is a 1992 Dutch horror film thriller directed by Rudolf van den Berg. It also known under the title Xangadix. The film was nominated for a Fantasy Film Award at the Porto Film Festival in Portugal. The music composed by Patrick Seymour (The Eurythmics) won an award for Best Soundtrack at the Avoriaz Film Festival in France and at the Imagfic Film Festival in Spain. The movie also received an award for its special effects. It was the last Dutch horror motion picture in the twentieth century and is considered to be one of the best Dutch horror (Netherhorror) feature films of all time, along with De Lift, Amsterdamned and The Human Centipede.

Plot
Victoria Lucas (played by Monique van de Ven) is a single mother who lives with her teenage daughter Emalee (played by Esmee de la Bretonière) in an apartment. Emalee is not normal, having come to life through test tube fertilization, under the assistance of Dr. Johnson. The doctor has not only made Emalee, but in secret also used the eggs of Victoria to make seven boys.

When Emalee is 14 years, her mother takes her on a camping holiday in the Biesbosch. From her 14th birthday, Emalee begins to suffer from nightmares, about seven identical men that are willing to do anything to fertilize her to fulfill a dark prophecy.

Cast
Monique van de Ven as Victoria Lucas
Esmée de la Bretonière as Emalee Lucas
Kenneth Herdigein as Professor Keller
Rik van Uffelen as de Graaf
Otto Sterman as vader Keller
Olga Zuiderhoek as Angela
Nelly Frijda as Tante van Peter
Miguel Stigter as Johnson 1, Bossie
Diederik van Nederveen as Johnson 2, Dakkie
Erik van Wilsum as Johnson 3, Tellie
Marcel Colin as Johnson 4, Droppie
Kees Hulst as Jansma
Nathan Moll as Johnson 5, Kniffie
Jan-Mark Wams as Johnson 6, Koppie
Michel Bonset as Johnson 7, Kurkie

Overview
The film's title is a reference to the surnames of the seven brothers, all born with the help of the American doctor Johnson. Originally, the idea of the movie "First Blood" called, referring to the first time that the character Emalee menstruates.

Documentary
In 2017 directors Bram Roza and Yfke van Berckelaer made a documentary about this obscure Dutch horror film called XANGADIX LIVES!

External links
 
 
 

Dutch horror films
1992 films
1990s Dutch-language films
1992 horror films
Films directed by Rudolf van den Berg